Estonian Naturalists' Society (ELUS) is the oldest Estonia-based society of naturalists. It was founded in 1853, and since establishing has been the major scientific organisation focusing on natural history of Estonia.

The Society is based in Tartu. It has been associated with Tartu University and the Estonian Academy of Sciences. The society still operates (2018) and claims to be the oldest scientific society in the Baltic states.

Presidents of the Society 
Carl Eduard von Liphardt (1853–1862)
Guido Samson von Himmelstiern (1862–1868)
Carl Johann von Seidlitz (1868–1869)
Karl Ernst von Baer (1869–1876)
Friedrich von Bidder (1877–1890)
Johann Georg Dragendorff (1890–1893)
Carl Schmidt (1894)
Edmund August Friedrich Russow (1895–1897)
Julius von Kennel (1898–1899)
Karl Gottfried Constantin Dehio (1899–1901)
Grigori Levitski (1901–1905)
Nikolai Kuznetsov (1905–1911)
Jevgeni Shepilevski (1911–1918)
Boriss Sreznevski (1918)
Georg Landesen (1918–1923)
Johannes Piiper (1923–1929)
Paul Kogerman (1929–1936)
Hugo Kaho (1936–1939)
Teodor Lippmaa (1939–1942)
Armin Öpik (1944)
Karl Orviku (1946–1952)
Harald Haberman (1952–1954)
Eerik Kumari (1954–1964)
Hans-Voldemar Trass (1964–1973 and 1985–1991)
Erast Parmasto (1973–1976)
Kuulo Kalamees (1976–1985)
Kalevi Kull (1991–1994)
Tõnu Möls (1994–2004)
Marek Sammul (2004–2008)
Tõnu Viik (2008–2014)
Oive Tinn (2014–2017)
Urmas Kõljalg (2017–)

See also
Jakob von Uexküll Centre
Estonian Malacological Society
Spring school on theoretical biology

References

Scientific organizations established in 1853
Biology organizations
Scientific organizations based in Estonia
1850s establishments in Estonia
Tartu
Naturalist societies
1853 establishments in the Russian Empire